Oxylymma is a genus of beetles in the family Cerambycidae, containing the following species:

 Oxylymma caeruleocincta Bates, 1885
 Oxylymma championi Bates, 1885
 Oxylymma durantoni Penaherrera-Leiva & Tavakilian, 2003
 Oxylymma faurei Penaherrera-Leiva & Tavakilian, 2003
 Oxylymma gibbicollis Bates, 1873
 Oxylymma lepida Pascoe, 1859
 Oxylymma sudrei Penaherrera-Leiva & Tavakilian, 2003
 Oxylymma telephorina Bates, 1870
 Oxylymma tuberculicolle Fisher, 1947

References

Further reading

Rhinotragini